Plococidaris is a monotypic genus of echinoderms belonging to the family Cidaridae. The only species is Plococidaris verticillata.

The species is found in Malesia and Indian Ocean.

References

Cidaridae
Cidaroida genera
Monotypic echinoderm genera